"When You Look Me in the Eyes" is a song by the American pop rock band Jonas Brothers. The song was released as the third and final single from their self-titled second album, Jonas Brothers, on February 4, 2008. In the United Kingdom, it was released as a double-A side with "Burnin' Up". There are two versions of the song, featuring different lyrics and production: the first was released on Nick Jonas's solo album, Nicholas Jonas (Joe and Kevin Jonas Sr. (dad) feature on the song, and Kevin Jonas (brother) plays guitar), and the second was released on the album Jonas Brothers. Jason Nevins produced a dance remix of the latter version for promotional release.

The band's When You Look Me in the Eyes Tour was named after the song, their most current single at the time of the tour. The song was featured on the album Now: The Hits of Spring 2008 in Australia.

Background and composition

When You Look Me in the Eyes, "avoids wallowing in cliche by featuring the ever-present youthful energy of Nick and Joe Jonas sharing vocals. Turning the song into a vocal duet lifts this record well above banality."

Music video
The music video premiered on January 25, 2008 on YouTube and on the Disney Channel after the worldwide premiere of Minutemen, and on April 20, 2008 on Disney Channel Asia. It shows the Jonas Brothers playing the song during a concert and footage of their personal lives. The video features the brothers' younger brother, Frankie Jonas, and is in black-and-white. The Disney Channel edit of the video features fans holding up a different sign from the one featured in the edit of the video released elsewhere. The video includes pieces filmed by Joe. Most of the music video was filmed inside The Eagles Club (The Rave) or outside in downtown Milwaukee, Wisconsin and in the Chicago, Illinois area.

Track listings

US and Europe CD single
 "When You Look Me in the Eyes"  — 4:09
 "S.O.S"  — 2:35

Chart performance
"When You Look Me in the Eyes" reached number 25 on the U.S. Billboard Hot 100. On August 15, 2008, the song re-entered the Australian ARIA Singles Chart, peaking at number 46; it became their highest-peaking song on the chart, surpassing "S.O.S" (number 47), but this record was surpassed again, with "Burnin' Up", peaking at number 38. It entered the UK Singles Chart  at number 30, as part of a double-A side with "Burnin' Up". It has sold 1,180,000 copies in the US.

Charts

Cover version
The American singer Austin Mahone has covered the song, and it's become one of his biggest songs on tour. When Austin performs the song, he invites one girl on stage to be the object of his affection.

Release history

References

External links
"When You Look Me in the Eyes" video

2008 singles
Jonas Brothers songs
Pop ballads
Rock ballads
Music videos directed by Robert Hales
Songs written by Kevin Jonas
Songs written by Joe Jonas
Songs written by Nick Jonas
Songs written by PJ Bianco
Hollywood Records singles
2007 songs
Song recordings produced by John Fields (record producer)